Alexey Kovalkov (April 19, 1962, Moscow) is a Russian dietitian, doctor of medical science, professor,  author of several books and the weight loss technique. One of the six most demanded dietitians in Moscow, according to the Forbes magazine.

Brief biography

Alexey was born on April 19, 1962, in Moscow. In 1991, he graduated from the general medicine department of the Pirogov Russian National Research Medical University (full-time tuition). In 2006, he completed the professional retraining in the field of nutrition studies under the Russian Medical Academy of Post-Graduate Education.
Kovalkov developed the unique weight loss technique, which is based on balanced nutrition and physical exercises. 
Since 2010, he has owned and run "Doctor Kovalkov's weight management clinic". Over 3000 patients lost their excess weight since the opening of the clinic.
In March, 2012 A. Kovalkov successfully defended his doctorate thesis on the topic: "Reasoning and application of the author's weight loss technique".

Activities
Alexey Kovalkov is the constant advisor for TV shows and documentary films of such Russian leading TV channels as: Channel One ("Environment" ("Sreda obitania"), "Test purchase" ("Kontrolnaya zakupka"), "Taste of life" ("Vkus zhizni"), etc.,); Channel Russia ("Morning in Russia" ("Utro Rossii"), "Happy new house! (talk-show)" ("S novym domom!"): "1000 detsils" ("1000 мелочей")); NTV, Ren-TV, etc. He is hosting the following TV shows: "Family size" ("Semeiny razmer") and "Food by the rules and without them" ("Eda po pravilam i bez") on the Domashy Channel. He is the host of the TV project "Give me my body back" ("Vernite moe telo") on the Mama Channel. Together with Maria Kulikova was a host of the TV show "Good doctor" ("Khoroshy vrach"). The host of the "Kilograms of fate" ("Kilogrammi sudbi") section and radio show "Quality mark" ("Знак качества") on radio Mayak. He provides various forums, magazines and newspapers with advice. He holds seminars and training sessions both in Russia and abroad. Since January 2014 he is the host of the TV show "To eat or not to eat" ("Est ili net") on the radio Vesti.FM. Alexey is a constant host and author of various shows on the radio KP.

Bibliography

In 2010 he published his first book "Victory over the weight. Doctor Kovalkov's technique" ("Pobeda nad vesom. Metodika doctora Kovalkova"). This book describes in details not only the technique itself, but also different reasons for excessive weight, influence of food on the body, importance of the physical training, etc.
In 2012, his second book "Losing weight wisely! Doctor Kovalkov's technique" ("Khudeyem s umom. Metodika doctora Kovalkova") was published.
In 2014, he published "Interesting way of losing weight. Recipes of delicious and healthy life" ("Khudeyem interesno. Retsepti vkusnoy I zdorovoy zhizni").
In February 2015, he published "One size less. New harmless express diet" ("Minus razmer. Novaya bezopasnaya ekspress dieta"). This book is intended for those who want to lose a little bit of weight, but cannot handle these annoying "last" two (five, ten...) kilograms.
In June 2015, he published the book called "Diet for gastronome" ("Dieta dlya gourmanov"). This is an illustrated gift version of the book "Interesting way of losing weight. Recipes of delicious and healthy life".

References

External links
 Official website
 Alexey Kovalkov's page on LiveJournal
 Official page of Doctor Kovalkov's clinic on Facebook
 It's not a diet, but a life style, mk.ru, January 24, 2012
 Alexey Kovalkov: "One should get a kick out of losing weight: eat at night and drink wine", kp.ru, September 21, 2011
 Why the weight doesn't reduce anymore, kp.ru, June 6, 2011
 Echo of European soy scandal: Why kids should not eat sausages, kp.ru, June 8, 2011
 How do school children get diabetes? kp.ru, June 7, 2011
 revealing how to get a good fit back by the beach season, 1tv.ru, March 15, 2011
 Reasons stopping you from losing weight, kp.ru

1962 births
Living people
Dietitians
Physicians from Moscow